Eric Daels (born 4 August 1936 in Wevelgem, West Flanders) is a retired Belgian footballer.

Career
Daels started playing football at the age of 14 with his local team SV Wevelgem. He soon made fame as a speedy forward. Daels  was discovered by Club Brugge in a match against Wevelgem. Club got a hard time winning, and afterwards, Club Brugge coach Lucien Masyn insisted on the recruitment of Eric Daels in the blue and black ranks. However, the Club Brugge board considered the transfer fee too high. A few season later, Daels got his transfer to Bruges: Cercle Brugge bought the player. Daels made his debut for Cercle against White Star in a 3-1 home victory. He had an important role in Cercle winning Belgian Second Division that season.

Daels was transferred to Excelsior Mouscron after the 1964-65 season, a transfer Daels actually did not want. After 1 season at Mouscron and 3 seasons with White Star Lauwe, he became player-coach for SV Moorsele, KEG Gistel, HO Wingene and KWS Houthulst. After Daels quit his playing career, he became manager for FC Knokke, Club Roeselare, Daring Ruddervoorde, FC Moerkerke, SC Beernem and FC Varsenare.

External links
Eric Daels at Cerclemuseum.be 

1936 births
Living people
People from Wevelgem
Belgian footballers
Association football forwards
Cercle Brugge K.S.V. players
Belgian Pro League players
Royal Excel Mouscron players
Player-coaches
Belgian football managers
Footballers from West Flanders